Publius Sulpicius Scribonius Proculus (died AD 67) was a Roman senator, who was active during the reign of Nero. He was suffect consul in the nundinium of September to October 56 as the colleague of his brother Publius Sulpicius Scribonius Rufus. Both brothers were denounced by the delator Gaius Paccius Africanus to the emperor Nero, who summoned the men to Achaia under false pretenses. Once they arrived, they were charged under the lex maiestas, and forced to commit suicide.

Lives 
The lives of the brothers are only known in part. M.A. Speidel notes that the origins of the Sulpicii Scribonii are not known, but they are likely from Italy. The father of the two men is identified as the senator Scribonius Proculus, whom the emperor Caligula had murdered.

Their cursi honori is known only from his consulate on.  Tacitus records that, when faced with a riot in Puteoli in the year 58 that one senator was unable to subdue, the emperor assigned a cohort to Proculus and Rufus and sent them to that city to restore order. An inscription from the colonia Luna (modern Luni) attests that he was appointed curator operum publicorum.

The most important appointment Proculus held was governor of the imperial province of Germania Inferior. Evidence for the date of his tenure is supplied by a military diploma dated to 17 June 65, and a building dedication from the year 66. His governorship was ended when the emperor Nero summoned the two brothers to their fatal appointment in Achaia.

References 

1st-century Romans
Suffect consuls of Imperial Rome
Roman governors of Germania Inferior
Year of birth unknown
67 deaths
Ancient Romans who committed suicide